Guipry-Messac is a commune in the Ille-et-Vilaine department of western France. The municipality was established on 1 January 2016 and consists of the former communes of Guipry and Messac.

Population

See also 
Communes of the Ille-et-Vilaine department

References 

Guiprymessac

Communes nouvelles of Ille-et-Vilaine
Populated places established in 2016
2016 establishments in France